New York's 147th State Assembly district is one of the 150 districts in the New York State Assembly. It has been represented by David DiPietro since 2013.

Geography
District 148 contains all of Wyoming County and the southern portion of Erie County.

Recent election results

2022

2020

2018

2016

2014

2012

References

147
Wyoming County, New York
Erie County, New York